Angostura Dam is an embankment dam across the Cheyenne River in Fall River County in southwestern South Dakota in the United States, about  south of Rapid City. The dam was conceived as early as 1913, but it was not until the 1930s when a regional drought caused crop failures that the project received widespread support from farmers. Built from 1946 to 1949, the dam is part of the Angostura Division of the Pick-Sloan Missouri Basin Program, and is operated by the U.S. Bureau of Reclamation.  

Angostura Reservoir is one of the only large lakes in western South Dakota.

The Angostura Recreation Area operated by the South Dakota Department of Game, Fish, and Parks surrounds the lake.

See also
Pick-Sloan Plan
U.S. Bureau of Reclamation

External links
U.S. Bureau of Reclamation - Angostura Dam
Angostura Recreation Area - South Dakota Department of Game, Fish, and Parks

References

Buildings and structures in Fall River County, South Dakota
Dams in South Dakota
Earth-filled dams
Gravity dams
Dams completed in 1949
United States Bureau of Reclamation dams
1949 establishments in South Dakota